8WM/Novakane is the third studio album by hip-hop duo Black Sheep, the group's first full-length album since 1994's Non-Fiction. It was released as a download-only album in October 2006, and a physical release followed in December 2007. Group member Mista Lawnge, while still briefly featured on the album, split from the group before the release, leaving Dres as Black Sheep's sole member. 8WM/Novakane features production from Vitamin D, BeanOne and long-time collaborator Showbiz. The album's lead single, "Whodat?" features a music video, which was released in October 2006.

Track listing
"U Mean I Don't"
"Grew Up"
"Be Careful"
"Hey"
"Whodat?"
"Sunshine"
"Shorty"
"8WM"
"Novakane"
"Everyday"
"Heed the Word"
"Wonder" (feat. Yummy Bingham)
"B-Boy's Theme"
"Novakane Groove"

External links
"Novakane Groove" music video
"Whodat?" music video

2006 albums
Black Sheep (group) albums
Albums produced by Showbiz (producer)